Kabaddi Kabaddi Kabaddi is a 2019 Nepali romantic comedy film, directed by Ram Babu Gurung. The film is produced by Mani Ram Pokharel, Arjun Karki, and Om Chand Rauniyar under the banner of Cinema Arts. The film stars Dayahang Rai, Upasana Singh Thakuri, Rishma Gurung, Karma, Wilson Bikram Rai, Buddhi Tamang, Bijaya Baral, Puskar Gurung, Kabita Ale, and Maotse Gurung. In the film, Kaji tries to live rest of his life with Maiya's memories but he falls in love with another girl. The film generally got positive feedback from the critics. Kabaddi Kabaddi Kabaddi is the third film in Kabaddi franchise. It is followed by its sequel Kabaddi 4: The Final Match breaking all records of Nepal.

Plot 
 
Following the incidents of Kabaddi Kabaddi, Kaji has become more arrogant. He says that love is not his agenda anymore. Kaji wants to live with Maiya's  memories for the rest of his life. He falls in love with his cousin Kashi but she loves someone else.

Cast 

 Dayahang Rai as Kaji 
 Upasana Singh Thakuri as Kashi
 Rishma Gurung as Maiya
 Karma as Myaki
 Wilson Bikram Rai as Dhan Kaji
 Buddhi Tamang as Chhantyal
 Bijaya Baral as Bir Kaji
 Puskar Gurung as Kaji's Father
 Kabita Ale as Kaji's Mother
 Maotse Gurung as Lal Kaji

Soundtrack

Release and reception 
Diwakar Pyakurel of Online Khabar praised the lead actors' performance, writing: "Not only popular Daya Hang Rai, but emerging Thakuri and Baral have given an impressive performance in the project." 

Sunny Mahat of The Annapurna Express said that the film is "an all-out entertainer and also offers a great lesson to Nepali filmmakers—you don't need to bar foreign films in order for the Nepali films to be successful. Just make good cinema." He rated the film 3 out of 5 stars, and described it as "a complete family entertainer".

Rupak Risal, writing for Moviemandu, said that the "viewers will have a gleeful time at the theater".

Kabaddi Kabaddi Kabaddi was listed in eighth place on a "Best Nepali Movies of 2019 You Need to Watch" list by Nepali Sansar. 

Abhimanyu Dixit of The Kathmandu Post said: "Kabaddi 3 is redundant. There's nothing we haven't seen before."

Kabaddi Kabaddi Kabaddi grossed 14.7 million Nepalese rupees (NPR) on its first day of screening, which set the record for the highest-grossing opening of a film in Nepal.

In three days, it collected 43.2 million NPR. The film collected around 110 million in total.

References

External links 

 

Nepalese romantic comedy films
2019 romantic comedy films
Nepalese sequel films
2019 films
Films shot in Pokhara